Claudio Giorgi (born in 1944) is an Italian actor and film director, active between the 1970s and the early 1980s.

Life and career 
Born Claudio Giorgiutti in Tarcento, Udine, Giorgi was mainly active as a main actor in fotoromanzi, while he occasionally played supporting roles in several genre films. From the mid-1970s he also worked as a production secretary and then as a film director, often credited under the pseudonym Claudio de Molinis. For two of his films he also contributed the screenplay.

Filmography 
 As a director 
 Ancora una volta... a Venezia (1975) 
 L'unica legge in cui credo (1976)  
 Candido Erotico (1978)  
 La febbre americana (1978)  
 Tranquille donne di compagna (1980) 
 There is a Ghost in My Bed (1981)

 As an actor 
 Yellow Emanuelle (1976)

References

External links 
 

1944 births
Italian film directors
Italian male film actors
People from the Province of Udine
Living people